Fichtsee is a lake in Sindelbach, Sindelsdorf, Landkreis Weilheim-Schongau, Bavaria, Germany.

Lakes of Bavaria